Milani (or Milāni) is an Italian surname. Notable people with the surname include:

Abbas Milani (born 1949), Iranian-American historian and author
Alfredo Milani (born 1924), Italian motorcycle racer
Andrea Milani, several people
Andrea Milani (footballer born 1919), Italian footballer with Inter Milan and Palermo
Andrea Milani (footballer born 1980), Italian footballer with Ancona
Andrea Milani (born 1948), Italian mathematician
Aureliano Milani (1675–1749), Italian Baroque painter
Aurelio Milani (born 1934), Italian footballer
Cesare Milani (1905–1956), Italian Olympic rower
Fadhil al-Milani (born 1944), Iraqi-Iranian jurist and professor
Gilberto Milani (born 1932), Italian motorcycle racer
Giulio Cesare Milani (c. 1621–1678), Italian Baroque painter
Laura Milani (born 1984), Italian rower
Leyla Milani (born 1982), Canadian model, actress, TV host, and fashion designer
Lorenzo Milani (1923–1967), Italian Roman Catholic priest
Marta Milani (born 1987), Italian sprint athlete
Mohammad Hadi al-Milani (1895–1975) Iraqi-Iranian senior jurist
Oscar Milani (born 1946), Argentine harpsichordist
Tahmineh Milani (born 1960), Iranian film director, screenwriter, and producer

See also
4701 Milani, a main-belt asteroid

Italian toponymic surnames